Yeghegnut (also Romanized as Yekheknut, Yekhegnut, Yegegnut, and Eghegnut; formerly, Kamyshkut) is a town in the Lori Province of Armenia.

References 

World Gazeteer: Armenia – World-Gazetteer.com

Populated places in Lori Province